Raj Bhavan (translation: Government House) is the official summer residence of the   Lieutenant Governor of Jammu and Kashmir. It is located in the summer capital city Srinagar, Jammu and Kashmir.

Raj Bhavan, Srinagar (Summer Capital City)

The Raj Bhavan is a small two-storey building mostly made of wood; it has lush green lawns having different varieties of roses and other beautiful flowers.

The President of India and the Prime Minister of India usually stay in the Raj Bhavan on their visits to Kashmir

See also
 List of official residences of India
 Government Houses of the British Indian Empire

References

External links

The official website of Governor of Jammu and Kashmir

Governors' houses in India
Government of Jammu and Kashmir
Buildings and structures in Srinagar